Balkan is an unincorporated community in Bell County, in the U.S. state of Kentucky.

History
A post office was established at Balkan in 1912, and remained in operation until 1982. It was named after the Balkans, in Southeast Europe, the native land of many of the early settlers in this mining community.

References

External links
 Guide to the James Walters photograph collection on Balkan, 1910-1912 housed at the University of Kentucky Libraries Special Collections Research Center

Unincorporated communities in Bell County, Kentucky
Unincorporated communities in Kentucky